Polly Evans is a journalist, broadcaster and producer and former anchor of the BBC regional news programme South East Today.

Career
Evans started broadcasting while studying at the University of Leeds, working early morning shifts on the campus radio station. She then went to Cardiff Journalism School to do a post-graduate diploma and later, travelled to post-war Bosnia to make a film about a new impartial television station for the country.

After working in Japan as an English teacher during a gap year, Evans joined BBC Radio Wales' features department, developing and producing networked programming for BBC Radio 4. She later joined the BBC Wales newsroom as a reporter and newsreader, before moving to BBC Radio Devon in Plymouth a year later. She then transferred to television as a reporter and presenter for Spotlight and The Politics Show in the South West.

Evans joined South East Today before the 2005 general election. In September 2009, she became a main presenter alongside Rob Smith, replacing Geoff Clark and Beverley Thompson. The show was named Best Nations and Regions news programme twice at the national Royal Television Society Awards while Evans and Rob Smith were the anchors.

In 2017, Evans transferred from presenting to producing South East Today, joining the programme's editorial staff in a temporary attachment role, during which she oversaw TV news coverage of the General Election in the region. She also worked on attachment as Social Affairs Correspondent.

Evans left the BBC in Autumn 2019. She is now the Head of Communications & Digital for The Access Project, a charity which helps bright students from disadvantaged backgrounds gain access to top Universities.

Personal life
Evans is married with two daughters.

Aside from her broadcasting work, she has presented the Learn Direct Achievement Awards, The EDF Energy Awards for Journalism and the FSB’s Brexit debate. She has also been a guest presenter of Tunbridge Wells International Young Concert Artist competition and a guest judge for the Culture Awards.

She is a Trustee of the charity Care for the Carers.

References

External links
 Polly Evans twitter account

Living people
People associated with the University of Leeds
English television presenters
Year of birth missing (living people)